Sapindus mukorossi, commonly known as Indian soapberry, washnut, or ritha, is a species of tree in the family Sapindaceae. It is also native to western coastal Karnataka, Maharashtra, and Goa in India; as well as southern China, and Taiwan as known by its many indigenous peoples. It is tolerant to reasonably poor soil, can be planted around farmers’ homes, and one tree can produce  of fruit per year.

Uses 

The value of the tree mostly comes from its fruit, which can be used for many pharmacological and cleansing purposes.

Cleanser/insecticide 
The soapnut contains the compound of saponin, which has natural cleansing properties, and therefore the soapnut can be used as a cleanser for hair, skin, and clothing. These saponins are also useful as insecticides, for purposes such as removing head lice off the scalp.

Surfactant 
Methods of extracting the maximum amount of oil from existing oil reserves has become a scientific focus in a world that has become dependent on fossil fuels. Researchers have found that the Ritha fruit can be used in an enhanced oil recovery technique. More specifically, Chhetri, Watts, Rahman, and Islam (2009) found that extracts from the soapnut can be used as an organic surfactant to increase the mobility of oil from the fields. In addition, researchers have demonstrated the potential for the soapnut to be used as a natural surfactant for washing arsenic from soils that are rich in iron.

References 

mukorossi
Flora of the Indian subcontinent
Flora of Indo-China
Saponaceous plants